|}

The Flyingbolt Novice Chase is Grade 3 National Hunt steeplechase in Ireland. It is run at Navan Racecourse in March, over a distance of 2 miles and 1 furlong and during the race there are 12 fences to be jumped. The race was first run in 2003 and was downgraded from Grade 2 to Grade 3 in 2017.

Records
Most successful jockey (4 wins):
 Ruby Walsh -  	True Blue Victory (2004), Young Desperado (2007), Shakervilz (2010), Sambremont (2016) 

Most successful trainer (3 wins): 
 Jessica Harrington –  Saludos (2011), Jetz (2019), Sizing Pottsie (2020) 
 Willie Mullins -  Shakervilz (2010), Sambremont (2016), Gentleman De Mee (2022)

Winners

See also
 Horse racing in Ireland
 List of Irish National Hunt races

References

Racing Post:

National Hunt races in Ireland
National Hunt chases
Navan Racecourse
Recurring sporting events established in 2003
2003 establishments in Ireland